Vannadil Pudiyaveettil Dhananjayan (born 17 April 1939) and Shanta Dhananjayan (born 12 August 1943), also known as the Dhananjayans, are a dancing couple in India who were awarded the Padma Bhushan in 2009.

Personal life
V.P Dhananjayan was born into a Malayali Poduval family on 17 April 1939 in Payyanur, Kannur District, Kerala, India. He was born into a family with eight children, which struggled to make ends meet. A chance meeting with Kathakali Master Guru Chandu Panicker of Kalakshetra made his father decide purely on instinct to send his son and V.Balagopalan to Kalakshetra under his tutelage. Dhananjayan joined Kalakshetra on 5 October 1953 and was a leading male dance under Rukmini Devi (founder of Kalakshetra) from 1955–1967. He graduated from Kalakshetra with a Post Graduate Diploma in Dance (Bharatanatyam and Kathakali) with distinction. He also holds a B.A in Economics and Politics. 	

Shanta Dhananjayan was born on 12 August 1943 into a Malayali Nair family in Malaysia and traces her ancestry back to Kerala from where her family migrated to Malaysia. She was a child prodigy. By the time she was 3, her parents were convinced that Shanta would be a dancer. They found in her an inborn response to dance and joy of movement and decided to send her to India for her education. They sent her at age eight to Kalakshetra in June 1952, a year before Dhananjayan, where she later graduated with a Post-Graduate Diploma with distinction in Bharatanatyam and also learned Kathakali and Carnatic music. She was a leading female dancer at Kalakshetra from 1955–1968.

The couple has two sons. The elder, Sanjay, lives in the USA and the younger, Satyajit, lives with his wife and son in Chennai, India and is a dancer, choreographer, dance instructor, and automobile photographer.

In Kalakshetra
Were it not for providence in the form of Guru Chandu Panicker, Dhananjayan would have been working in some mundane job in Kerala. Dhananjayan received a scholarship at Kalakshetra to study Bharatanatyam, Kathakali, Mridangam and music. Shanta trained in Bharatanatyam and music,  in addition to other subjects for nearly a decade. They believe that whatever they have been able to achieve is due to the painstaking mentoring of their Gurus Rukmini Devi Arundale and Chandu Panicker as well as various other faculty members of Kalakshetra such as NS Jayalakshmi and Sarada Hoffman.

While at Kalakshetra, it was love at first sight for Dhananjayan. Shanta was the first girl he met as he was being escorted into the portals of Kalakshetra by Guru Panicker. Though Shanta was a serious student completely devoted to her dance and music, she had secretly made up her mind, at the age of twelve, to partner Dhananjayan in life. Dhananjayan expressed his desire to marry Shanta when she was eighteen years old, but she left for Malaysia after graduation and did not let him know of her consent till after returning to India four years later. They married in 1966 at the Guruvayoor Temple in Kerala.

Career – Dancing Duo
The Dhananjayans left Kalakshetra in the late 1960s to build a career on their own. During that time, the rich people and aristocrats who could pay to have their own children perform dominated the dance scene in Chennai. 

Their performances/productions include:
Pandit Ravi Shankar's Magnum Opus "GHANASHYAM" 1989/90
National Dance Institute, New York "CHAKRA", with a cast of 1,000 multinational children
A joint venture of Ohio Ballet Co., Cuyahoga Community College and Cleveland Cultural Alliance – Jungle Book Ballet
Choreographer for International Art Festival of Government of Singapore, "Sita Rama Katha" 1986 in the same festival, choreographed dance drama "Sanghamitra" with Singapore Artistes 1994
Mahaabhaaratham dance drama jointly produced by French Theatre Fluerry & Association Vaani in Reunion French Island 1998, 1999

Bharata Kalanjali
The Dhananjayans started their own dance school Bharata Kalanjali in 1968 in Adyar, Chennai. It began with a handful of students, and is today a premier academy of dance and music with several hundreds of students and a repertory fashioned out of its own students and graduates.

Bhaaskara
The couple has established an academy of arts at Dhananjayan's birthplace Payyanur in Kerala. They conducted an annual summer Naatya Gurukulam camp which is no longer in operation.

Yogaville
The Dhananjayans have been conducting an annual summer gurukulam camp at the Satchidananda Ashram, Yogaville, Virginia, USA, since 1988. Developed by the Natya Adyayana Gurukulam, the camp is an intensive, full-time residential course devoted entirely to the fine arts. Situated in the Virginia countryside, it is attended by Indian-American and international students. The teachers endeavour through it to spread awareness to their students of Indian culture, values, and explicate the philosophy underlying Hinduism.

Honours
Some of the major awards and accolades conferred on the Dhananjayans:
Padma Bhushan, Government of India, 2009
Kerala Sangeetha Nataka Akademi Fellowship, 1994

Social issues and politics
Dhananjayan has the reputation of voicing his views and is very forthright in speaking out about social and political issues. His recent publication Beyond performing art and culture, discusses various social and political issues concerning present day India or Bhaaratam, the way he urges everyone to call the country.

Publications
V.P Dhananjayan is a prolific writer and writes not only on dance but also on social and political issues. His publications include:
Beyond Performing Art and Culture : Politico-Socio Aspects, V.P. Dhananjayan. New Delhi, B.R. Rhythms, 2007, xviii, 314 p., ills, .
Dhananjayan on Indian Classical Dance, V.P Dhananjayan, B.R Rhythms, 2004, 3rd revised edition,

References

External links

Dancers from Kerala
Recipients of the Padma Bhushan in arts
Performers of Indian classical dance
Teachers of Indian classical dance
Bharatanatyam exponents
Kalakshetra Foundation alumni
Art duos
People from Kannur district
Married couples
Women educators from Kerala
20th-century Indian educators
20th-century Indian dancers
Educators from Kerala
20th-century Indian women artists
Women artists from Kerala
Indian female classical dancers
20th-century women educators
Recipients of the Sangeet Natak Akademi Award
Recipients of the Kerala Sangeetha Nataka Akademi Fellowship